Uptown is a PID (public improvement district) and a dense neighborhood in Dallas, Texas. Uptown is north of and adjacent to  downtown Dallas, and is bordered by US 75 (Central Expressway) on the east, N Haskell Avenue on the northeast, the Katy Trail on the northwest, Bookhout Street and Cedar Springs Road on the west, N Akard Street on the southwest and Spur 366 (Woodall Rodgers Freeway) on the south.

Uptown is one of the most pedestrian-friendly areas in all of Texas. It is largely "new urbanist" in scope; the majority of facilities considered "Uptown institutions" are relatively new and were created during the late 20th and early 21st Centuries' new urbanist urban planning movement.  Popular with young professionals, mixed-use development is the norm and an increasingly pedestrian culture continues to thrive.

History 

The Uptown area was originally outside the city limits of Dallas, and was home to those not welcome in the city. The west side, near present-day Harry Hines Boulevard, once hosted a large Hispanic neighborhood known as Little Mexico.  The east side, now anchored by Cityplace Center, was the site of the Freedmen's Town established by freed African-American slaves.  Very little of this working-class history remains, with the Hispanic west being turned into high-rise buildings, and the African-American east being destroyed by the construction of Central Expressway and Woodall Rodgers Freeway. All that remains of Freedmen's Town is the Freedmen's Cemetery, which gained national recognition when Central Expressway reconstruction revealed over 1,100 graves beneath existing and proposed roadways.

Until the late 1990s, this area was simply called the eastern part of Oak Lawn, but was re-branded as "Uptown" in the early 2000s to attract real estate investment.

About 

Uptown is one of the most pedestrian-friendly areas in the city of Dallas. It is largely "new urbanist" in scope; the majority of facilities considered "Uptown institutions" are relatively new and were created during the late 20th and early 21st Centuries' new urbanist urban planning movement.

The district is one of the most dense in Dallas and is home to a diverse set of establishments including office buildings, residential towers, apartment complexes, retail centers, nightlife strips, and hotels. This mixed-use development practice leads to an urban lifestyle for its residents, unlike the compartmentalized social structures of suburban bedroom communities and office parks which make up the majority of Dallas and its suburbs.

68.9% of Uptown residents hold a bachelor's degree or higher, and the median household income is $79,699.

Economy 
Businesses continuously relocate to Uptown Dallas to attract educated millennial workers who tend to demand the urban lifestyle that the neighborhood offers. Consequently, despite the boom of high-rise construction in Uptown, the commercial vacancy rate continues to drop and is currently 11.7%, compared to the vacancy rate of 20% in downtown.

The educated nature of Uptown residents greatly benefits elite firms such as McKinsey & Company, Boston Consulting Group, Bain & Company, Deloitte, and Goldman Sachs, all of which are located in the neighborhood. Additionally, two Fortune 500 companies call Uptown home: Dean Foods and Holly Frontier.

Along with commercial high-rises, residential buildings are also going up quickly in Uptown. The newest apartments in Uptown cost an average of $1,800 per month, compared to the Dallas average of $888 per month. Recent projects include the Carlisle & Vine, which consists of 131 apartment homes, and a Whole Foods Market store on the ground level fronting McKinney Avenue.

Education

Public (Dallas ISD) 
Residents are within the Dallas Independent School District.

Houston Elementary School and Milam Elementary School cover portions of Uptown. All residents are zoned to Rusk Middle School and North Dallas High School. The William B. Travis Academy/Vanguard for the Academically Talented and Gifted is located in Uptown.

The Roman Catholic Diocese of Dallas manages Catholic schools. Notre Dame School of Dallas, for intellectually disabled children, is in Uptown.

Transportation

Major Highways 

 U.S. Highway 75 - (Central Expressway)
 Spur 366 (Woodall Rodgers Freeway)

Streetcars 
 McKinney Avenue Transit Authority - the M-Line - Free
Stop sites along the route include: The Gallery Walk Shopping District, Stanley Korshak (at the Crescent), West Village, Hotel Zaza, four historical cemeteries and The Dallas Museum of Art.
The MATA Trolley extends into the north part of the Downtown Dallas area.  Residents of Uptown Dallas may use this free trolley to commute to downtown dallas.

Trains

Light rail 
 DART:  and 
 Cityplace Station
 DART: 
 Victory Station

Neighborhoods 

West Village
State Thomas
McKinney Ave
The Pearl
Oak Lawn (partially Uptown)
Turtle Creek (partially Uptown)
Victory Park (partially Uptown)

References

External links 

 
 Uptown Dallas Association
 Dallas Uptown Guide
Uptown Neighborhoods 

Economy of Dallas
New Urbanism communities